Rui Patrício Correia Torres Neves (born 15 December 1997) is a Portuguese footballer who plays for C.D. Aves as a goalkeeper.

References

External links

Portuguese League profile 

1997 births
Living people
Portuguese footballers
Association football goalkeepers
Liga Portugal 2 players
C.D. Aves players